The Tornado outbreak sequence of March 18–24, 2012 was a long lasting tornado outbreak that occurred due to a slow moving, but powerful trough and cutoff low. The outbreak began in the Great Plains, where, over a two-day period, several tornadoes touched down, some of which were significant. The North Platte area was damaged by an EF3 that was produced by a supercell that spawned many tornadoes throughout its lifespan. The tornadic activity then shifted the Southern United States over subsequent days, particularly in Louisiana and Mississippi. These states were struck by a series of tornadoes for 3 days, most of which were relatively weak on the Enhanced Fujita Scale. However, a few reached EF2 intensity and caused considerable damage. Tornado activity continued across the Ohio Valley on the 23rd, with one confirmed fatality in southern Illinois.

Meteorological synopsis

March 18–19

March 20–22

March 23–24
A slight risk was issued for parts of the Ohio Valley, but notable tornado activity was not expected. However several tornadoes touched down across Indiana, Illinois, Ohio, and Kentucky. Supercell thunderstorms developed and produced large hail as well. One high-end EF1 tornado caused considerable damage to homes in the Louisville metro area. An EF2 tornado caused one fatality in southern Illinois when a mobile home was thrown and completely destroyed. On the 24th, an isolated EF0 touched down in Florida as the outbreak moved eastward and came to an end.

Confirmed tornadoes

March 18 event

March 19 event

March 20 event

March 21 event

March 22 event

March 23 event

March 24 event

See also
List of North American tornadoes and tornado outbreaks
List of United States tornadoes in March 2012

References

03-18
Tornadoes in Louisiana
Tornadoes in Mississippi
Tornadoes in Nebraska
Tornado,2012-03-18
Tornado